Kachi Mach'ay Urqu (Quechua kachi salt, mach'ay cave, urqu mountain, "salt cave mountain", hispanicized spelling Cachimachay Orjo) is a mountain in the Chunta mountain range in the Andes of Peru, about  high. It is located in the Huancavelica Region, Huancavelica Province, Huancavelica District. Kachi Mach'ay Urqu lies west of Antarasu and northeast of Wachu Intiyuq.

References

Mountains of Huancavelica Region
Mountains of Peru